The 1908 Wyoming Cowboys football team represented the University of Wyoming as an independent during the 1908 college football season. In their second and final season under head coach Robert Ehlman, the team compiled a 1–2 record and was outscored by a total of 95 to 66.

Schedule

References

Wyoming
Wyoming Cowboys football seasons
Wyoming Cowboys football